Kenneth L. Johnson Health, Physical, Education & Recreation Complex is a 4,500-seat multi-purpose arena in Pine Bluff, Arkansas, USA. It is home to the University of Arkansas at Pine Bluff Lions men's and women's basketball teams and women's volleyball team. It originally opened in 1982 and was extensively renovated in 2006. The basketball and volleyball portion is called the Hubert O. Clemmons Basketball Arena.

It hosted the NCAA Women's Division II Basketball Championship in 1999 and 2000.

See also
 List of NCAA Division I basketball arenas

References

College basketball venues in the United States
Sports venues in Arkansas
Indoor arenas in Arkansas
Buildings and structures in Pine Bluff, Arkansas
Arkansas–Pine Bluff Golden Lions men's basketball
1982 establishments in Arkansas
Sports venues completed in 1982
College volleyball venues in the United States
Basketball venues in Arkansas